Robert Fraser (10 August 1858 – 28 March 1914) was a Scottish Roman Catholic bishop who served as the Bishop of Dunkeld from 1913 to 1914.

Life
Born in Kennethmont, Aberdeenshire, Scotland on 10 August 1858, he was educated at the junior seminary St Mary's College, Blairs, St. Edmund's in Douai, and the Scots College (Rome). He was ordained to the priesthood on 13 August 1882. He served as a professor at Blairs from 1883 to 1897, when he was appointed rector of the Scots College, a post he held until 1913. Fraser wrote the article on the "Scots College" for the Catholic Encyclopedia.

Fraser was made a domestic prelate in 1898, and a Protonotary apostolic in 1904. He was appointed the Bishop of the Diocese of Dunkeld by the Holy See on 14 May 1913, and consecrated to the Episcopate on 25 May 1913. The principal consecrator was Cardinal Rafael Merry del Val y Zulueta, and the principal co-consecrators were Archbishop Thomas Francis Kennedy, Rector of the Pontifical North American College and Donald Aloysius Mackintosh, 
Coadjutor Archbishop of Glasgow.

He died in office on 28 March 1914, aged 55.

References 

1858 births
1914 deaths
People from Aberdeenshire
20th-century Roman Catholic bishops in Scotland
Bishops of Dunkeld (Roman Catholic, Post-Reformation)
People educated at Blairs College
Contributors to the Catholic Encyclopedia
Scottish Roman Catholic bishops